The Solo technical routine competition at the 2019 World Aquatics Championships was held on 12 and 13 July 2019.

Results
The preliminary round was started on 12 July at 11:00. The final was held on 13 July at 19:00.

Green denotes finalists

References

Solo technical routine